Plutonium arsenide is a binary inorganic compound of plutonium and arsenic with the formula PuAs.

Synthesis
Fusion of stoichiometric amounts of pure substances in a vacuum or helium atmosphere. The reaction is exothermic:
 Pu + As → PuAs 

Passing arsine through heated plutonium hydride:
2PuH2 + 2AsH3 → 2PuAs + 5H2

Physical properties
Plutonium arsenide forms black or dark gray crystals of a cubic system, space group Fm3m, cell parameters a = 0.5855 nm, Z = 4, structure of the NaCl-type.

At high pressure (about 35 GPa), a phase transition occurs to a structure of the CsCl-type.

At a temperature of 129 °K, PuAs transforms into a ferromagnetic state.

References

Arsenides
Plutonium(III) compounds
Rock salt crystal structure